Pettine is an Italian surname that may refer to the following notable people:
Giuseppe Pettine (1874–1966), Italian-American mandolinist
Mike Pettine (born 1966), American football coach and former player 
Raymond James Pettine (1912–2003), United States District Judge

Italian-language surnames